Cariblatta lutea is a small species of cockroach native to the United States and other countries, measuring usually around 7 millimeters long as an adult and under 2 millimeters from head tip to abdomen tip at the 1st instar or hatchling. It consists of two subspecies, the small yellow cockroach (Cariblatta lutea lutea), and the least yellow cockroach (Cariblatta lutea minima).

The ootheca, or egg case, of C. lutea has been suggested as a possible host of an ensign wasp, Hyptia floridana.

Subspecies
There are two identified subspecies of Cariblatta lutea: Cariblatta lutea lutea (Saussure & Zehntner 1893) and Cariblatta lutea minima Hebard 1916. Habitat differences and the broad overlap in distribution of the two subspecies in peninsular Florida have prompted the suggestion that they may warrant recognition as distinct species.

Description
Cariblatta lutea lutea is a pale brownish-yellow, with a pale brown head, a band between the eyes, and usually some dark brown spots on the face. The disc of the pronotum (head shield) is usually marked with several small brownish spots, and its sides are transparent. The tegmina (leathery forewings) typically don't quite reach the apex of the abdomen. The tegmina of males are stinctly shorter than those of females, and the tips of the tegmina are rounded on females. The subgenital plate of the between the styles of the male is three times as long as it is broad. In females, the subgenital plate is large and boat-shaped with a rounded apex. Females of the subspecies tend to be larger than the males, with much shorter wings.

Cariblatta lutea minima is on average smaller and has shorter tegmina than Cariblatta lutea lutea. Males of the C. l. minima subspecies also have shorter inner rudimentary wings, and a much narrower subgenital plate, than C. l. lutea.

Etymology
The genus Cariblatta was named after the Carib people of the Caribbean.  Blatta means “an insect who shuns light” in Latin, referring to cockroaches as well as moths and other insects. Lutea means yellow, saffron, if mud or clay, good for nothing in Latin.

Distribution
Cariblatta lutea lutea is found in the coastal plains of the southeastern USA including Alabama, Florida, Georgia, Louisiana, Mississippi, North Carolina, South Carolina, Texas, and Virginia, as well as the island nation of Cuba.

Cariblatta lutea minima is documented only in Cuba and several counties of the state of Florida.

Habitat

Cariblatta lutea lutea is found in leaf, grass, and pine needle litter in forests in the southeastern US. In Florida it is commonly found in a variety of plant communities in Florida, and has also been found in gopher burrows, disturbed areas, and near houses.

Cariblatta lutea minima is found in hardwood hammocks in southern peninsular Florida and in the Keys, in open pinelands in Dade County, and in a variety of scrub, flatwoods, and hammock plant communities in northeastern Florida. It has also been collected in Spartina marshes, and sawgrass marshes, and in grasses behind beaches.

Additional Images

References

Cockroaches
Insects described in 1893
Insects of the United States